Rosanne "Ro" Bailey (July 10, 1950 – November 1, 2016) was an American military officer and academic administrator.  A retired United States Air Force brigadier general, she was named vice chancellor for administrative services at the University of Alaska Fairbanks (UAF) in August 2006 following retirement from her military career. She oversaw administrative offices such as budget, business operations, purchasing, personnel, risk management, environmental health and safety, the fire and police departments, and facilities services.

Career
Born in Chicago, Illinois, Bailey earned a Bachelor of Science degree with honors from Purdue University in 1973. Commissioned a second lieutenant through Officer Training School in 1977, her early assignments include program analyst for the Joint Tactical Information Distribution System, systems officer for Air Force Systems Command, and program manager for the F/FB/EF-111 digital flight control system. In 1988, she won two research awards at Air Command and Staff College, from which she was a distinguished graduate.

Bailey served as acquisition adviser to the Office of the Secretary of the Air Force, and commander of the 354th Logistics Group at Eielson AFB, Alaska. She also served as Armament Product Group manager and Detachment 5 commander for the Aeronautical Systems Center at Eglin AFB, Florida, and director of the Aeronautical Enterprise Program Office, Wright-Patterson AFB, Ohio. She was commander of 435th Air Base Wing, Ramstein Air Base, and commander of Kaiserslautern Military Community, Germany, and commander of Cheyenne Mountain Operations Center, Cheyenne Mountain Air Force Station, Colorado, where she was responsible for executing the North American Aerospace Defense Command's integrated tactical warning and attack assessment mission, the U.S. Northern Command's homeland defense mission, and U.S. Strategic Command's space and missile warning support.

Major awards and decorations
 Defense Superior Service Medal
 Legion of Merit with three oak leaf clusters
 Meritorious Service Medal with four oak leaf clusters
 Joint Service Commendation Medal
 National Defense Service Medal with bronze star

Other achievements
 Dudley C. Sharp Logistics Award
 Major General Frederick J. Dau Award for best product group management in AFMC
 Distinguished graduate, Defense Systems Management College

References

1950 births
2016 deaths
Military personnel from Chicago
Purdue University alumni
Recipients of the Defense Superior Service Medal
Recipients of the Legion of Merit
United States Air Force generals
University of Alaska Fairbanks people
Women in the United States Air Force